Mijhaura is a village and a gram panchayat in Ambedkar Nagar district in the Indian state of Uttar Pradesh.

References

Cities and towns in Ambedkar Nagar district